Copeland's Cure is a book-length history of the rivalry between mainstream medicine and homeopathy written by Natalie Robins and published by Knopf in 2005.

Further reading 

 
 
 
 
 
 
 
 
 

2005 non-fiction books
Alfred A. Knopf books
Books about the history of science
American history books
History books about the United States
English-language books